Diving Science and Technology (or DSAT) is a corporate affiliate of the Professional Association of Diving Instructors (PADI) and the developer of the Recreational Dive Planner. DSAT has held scientific workshops for diver safety and education.

See also

References

Diving organizations